Halls Flat is a location in Lassen County, California on the Western Pacific Railroad  south-southwest of Little Valley, at an elevation of 5705 feet (1739 m). It was the site of a Civilian Conservation Corps camp, and in the 1940 became the location of a lumber camp named after Paul Bunyan, which operated to the end of the decade.

References

External links
Halls Flat at ghosttowns.com

Unincorporated communities in California
Unincorporated communities in Lassen County, California